is a third-person shooter video game developed and published by Nintendo for the Nintendo Switch. It is the third game in the Splatoon series following Splatoon 2. Like its predecessors in the Splatoon series, the game consists of online multiplayer (player versus player and player versus environment) alongside a single-player campaign, all featuring combat based around ink.

The game was first revealed in a teaser trailer on 17 February 2021 and was subsequently released on 9 September 2022. It received generally favorable reviews from critics. As of 30 December 2022, Splatoon 3 has sold 10.13 million copies worldwide, making it the fastest-selling game in the franchise and one of the best-selling Switch games.

Gameplay

Like its predecessors in the Splatoon series, Splatoon 3 is a third-person shooter. Players choose to be either an "Inkling" or "Octoling" as their player character. Both wield weaponry that uses colored ink. Weapons are diverse in ability and imagery, with most resembling household objects. For example, Rollers are large paint rollers that can cover large amounts of area in ink but are generally limited to close-range combat. At the same time, Chargers are weapons which resemble a sniper rifle, and have long range for sniping opponents but are less effective at painting the ground. Splatoon 3 expands upon this by adding new main and special weapons to the game. Main weapons are able to be chosen by the player, while special weapons are assigned to specific main weapons and require the player to cover the ground with a varying amount of ink in order to charge it up. Inklings and Octolings have the ability to morph into a squid or octopus form respectively. This form is referred to as the "swim form", and can be used to climb ink-covered walls or swim through ink faster than the humanoid forms can walk. Weapons have a finite amount of ink ammunition, and submerging in ink via the swim form replenishes it quicker than in humanoid form. All basic weapons from the prior Splatoon games return in Splatoon 3.

Modes

Competitive 

Returning from its predecessors as a playable online multiplayer game mode is Regular Battle, known as Turf War. In Turf War, two teams of four players compete to cover the most amount of the map's area in their respective ink color. Each team can cover over an area covered by the opponents ink with their own color. When walked on, the opposing team's ink slows movement, gradually deals damage and prevents the use of the player's swim form. Each player is equipped with a weapon set, chosen before each match, and each set comes with secondary and special weapons in addition to its main weapon. Secondary weapons provide alternative methods of attacking the other team and inking the ground; for example, Splat Bombs that explode a second after contact with the surface and Burst Bombs that explode upon impact. When enough ground is covered in a player's ink, they may use a special weapon, which are primarily used to attack the opposing team. Weapons and other forms of attack can deal damage to opposing players; when enough damage is given, they will "splat" their opponent, forcing them to restart from their starting location. Whichever team covers the largest portion of the field at the end of the match is declared the winner.

Once a player gains enough experience points to reach level 10, they gain access to a ranked mode called Anarchy Battles, featuring several different battle types. Clam Blitz sees players collect golden clams and deposit them in the opponent's goals, with the team who deposited the most clams by the end of the match declared the winner. In Splat Zones, two teams aim to control one or two "splat zones" for a set amount of time. A zone is controlled when it is 70% covered in a teams ink, and if the map has two zones both must be controlled for the timer to count down. Tower Control functions similarly to king of the hill, requiring a team to control a moving tower. When the tower is controlled by one team, it moves toward that team's goal line, stopping to clear checkpoints along the way, with a team winning when the tower reaches their goal line. The Rainmaker game mode functions similarly to capture the flag, in which players attempt to carry a weapon called the Rainmaker from the center of the stage to various checkpoints until they reach the opponent's side of the map.

This game also sees the return of "Splatfests", where players choose to join one of three teams (compared to the two teams in the previous games) over a particular theme, and over three days they engage in matches to gain the most points for victory. In Splatoon 3, a new "Tricolor Turf War"  can occur by the second half of a Splatfest, where one team of four players aims to defend the "Ultra Signal" at the center of the map from two teams of attacking players. When an attacking team takes control of the Ultra Signal, it will summon the "Sprinkler of Doom", which will automatically ink a portion of the map's area for that team over time.

Salmon Run 

The co-op player versus environment (PvE) mode Salmon Run returns, titled Salmon Run Next Wave. The main goal is to collect Golden Eggs, obtained by splatting special enemies known as "Boss Salmonids", and carry them to a basket. Salmon Run Next Wave uses the same basic gameplay as it does in Splatoon 2, where the player, employed by Grizzco Industries, teams up with three other players to fight waves of enemies known as "Salmonids". If a player gets splatted, the game's version of getting killed, another player can revive them by shooting them with ink. If the quota for eggs is not met within the time limit or the entire team is wiped out, the shift ends. Each "shift" typically lasts three waves, though, in Next Wave, a fourth "Xtrawave" sometimes occurs, where players team up to fight a King Salmonid. By successfully meeting the quota of golden eggs for all waves in a shift, the player can increase their rank within Grizzco. Next Wave adds the ability to throw golden eggs along with new enemies and new "Known Occurrence" events. Salmon Run is also no longer limited to certain times of day; players are able to access Salmon Run at any time, even during Splatfests. A new addition to Splatoon 3 is "Big Run", an event where Salmonids invade the city of Splatsville. Players defend Splatsville by fighting invading Salmonids on an online competitive map, instead of the unique stages typically used for Salmon Run. After a few days, the event ends and participating players receive a prize. This event occurs every few months.

Tableturf Battle 
A new mode present in Splatoon 3 is Tableturf Battle, a digital collectible card game based on Turf War in which players build a deck composed of collected trading cards. In Tableturf Battle, each card can be used to apply a pattern to a grid, and after a "special attack" is charged, it can be used to place a pattern that overwrites the opponent's patterns.

Setting 
The Splatoon games take place on a version of Earth set far in the future after the extinction of humanity and almost all mammal life, suggested to be due to climate change, where much of oceanic life has evolved to live on land. Splatoon 3 takes place five years after the events of Splatoon 2 in the Splatlands, a sun-scorched desert inhabited by battle-hardened Inklings and Octolings, and Splatsville, a city of chaos that seems to have developed rapidly since the last Splatfest, Chaos vs. Order. The game's design is themed around chaos due to the outcome of the last Splatfest. 

The story mode of Splatoon 3, titled Return of the Mammalians, is set in a new location called Alterna, a large, snowy area littered with incomplete structures and hazardous Fuzzy Ooze, an ink-like substance mostly covered in brown fur, with a rocket at its center. It focuses on the reappearance of mammals, which have been long-extinct.

Plot 
Upon following the elderly squid Craig Cuttlefish into a crater covered with lethal Fuzzy Ooze, the player is recruited by Cuttlefish into the New Squidbeak Splatoon as Agent 3 along with their pet Salmonid Smallfry known as "Little Buddy" . Little Buddy is able to eat and destroy some of the ooze, allowing passage further into the crater. They fight Octarian enemies mutated with fur, which Cuttlefish believes are responsible for once again stealing the Great Zapfish that powers Splatsville. At the crater's base, Octarian leader DJ Octavio accuses Cuttlefish of taking his Octarian warriors and denies taking the Zapfish. After defeating Octavio, the ground breaks open, and Cuttlefish and Agent 3 fall into the remains of the underground city Alterna, which the fuzzy Octarians have turned into a base. In Alterna, Agent 3 meets Callie and Marie of the New Squidbeak Splatoon, as well as the Captain, the player protagonist of the first game, and realizes that Cuttlefish has gone missing. They are approached by the idol group Deep Cut, who are searching Alterna for treasure and believe the Squidbeak Splatoon is there for the same reason. Aided by an artificial intelligence named O.R.C.A they explore the city in search of Cuttlefish, but are repeatedly led to signals from the members of Deep Cut and forced to fight them over the "treasure", which appears to be junk. It is revealed that Mr. Grizz, CEO of Grizzco and organizer of Salmon Run, has kidnapped Cuttlefish and is responsible for taking the Great Zapfish and Octarian army. Mr. Grizz explains that he aims to restore mammal life to Earth by converting other life into mammals by using the Fuzzy Ooze. 

When all members of Deep Cut are defeated, they explain their intention to sell the treasure for charity, and team up with the Splatoon to defeat Mr. Grizz. After using the treasure to assemble a cutting device and reaching the rocket at the center of Alterna where Cuttlefish is being held, they find Mr. Grizz has "dehydrated" Cuttlefish for his "essence", seemingly killing him. Mr. Grizz, who is a massive bear and one of the only remaining mammals, explains that the rocket is rigged to explode and cover the entire Earth in Fuzzy Ooze, reviving mammal life at the expense of all other life on the planet. The Captain revives Cuttlefish as Mr. Grizz launches the rocket into space, and Deep Cut provides Agent 3 a lift onto it. Agent 3, with help from DJ Octavio and Little Buddy, who transforms into a "Hugefry" form (resembling a giant coho salmon), defeats Mr. Grizz and destroys the rocket. Agent 3, Little Buddy, and Octavio return to Earth with the Great Zapfish, and Mr. Grizz is seen floating in space during the credits.

Development 
Splatoon 3 was developed by Nintendo EPD, with additional work done by Monolith Soft, who also assisted in the development of previous Splatoon games, as well as SRD and Bandai Namco Studios Singapore & Malaysia. The game makes use of NLPN, Nintendo's in-house server system, which supports expanded lobby features and better matchmaking.

At E3 2019, after the announcement of Splatoon 2s final Splatfest, "Chaos vs. Order", Splatoon producer Hisashi Nogami stated that a third entry in the series was not in development. In an "Ask the Developer" interview on Nintendo's website, it was revealed that the direction of Splatoon 3s world was decided after Team Chaos won Splatoon 2s final Splatfest, with the developers planning for both outcomes before the Splatfest winner was decided. In a Splatoon 3 Direct on 10 August 2022, Nintendo confirmed that the game would receive two years worth of updates releasing every three months, which would feature the addition of more stages and weapons, as well as large-scale paid downloadable content (DLC).

In a Nintendo Direct released on 8 February 2023, two waves of DLC were announced, with the first wave including Inkopolis (the main hub from the first game) and the second wave including a new single player campaign.

Marketing and release
Splatoon 3 was announced with a teaser trailer in a Nintendo Direct on 17 February 2021. The trailer revealed items, weapons, abilities, and an apocalyptic design. More details were revealed later that year in September, including the name of Splatoon 3 single-player mode, Return of the Mammalians.

A trailer for Splatoon 3 co-op mode "Salmon Run" premiered in a Nintendo Direct on 9 February 2022. On 22 April, Nintendo uploaded a video to its YouTube channel showing gameplay of the "Turf War" game mode, as well as providing an exact release date of 9 September 2022. Additionally, Splatoon 2: Octo Expansion was announced to be included with the Expansion Pack tier of Nintendo Switch Online. In July, Nintendo announced a special edition Nintendo Switch OLED model themed on the game, with a release date of 26 August 2022. In addition, the company announced a Splatoon 3-themed Pro Controller and carrying case, which released alongside the game.

On 10 August 2022, Nintendo broadcast a Splatoon 3-focused Nintendo Direct, revealing the date for the game's Splatfest World Premiere, a limited time demo Splatfest. Nintendo announced that the game would have amiibo support, with several new figurines that can be used to take photos with the characters in-game and receive special gear items, similar to past Splatoon titles. It introduced three new "idol" characters known as Big Man, Shiver, and Frye, collectively referred to as "Deep Cut". Also announced in the Nintendo Direct, the game is set to receive both large-scale paid DLC and two years of support via free updates. On 25 August 2022, a Nintendo Treehouse Presentation was broadcast which showcased the single-player story mode and the multiplayer lobby, alongside weapons and multiplayer maps.

The pre-launch Splatfest World Premiere event was held on 27 and 28 August 2022 with a rock-paper-scissors theme, which Team Rock won in all regions. The game was released worldwide on 9 September 2022. In a trailer on 11 October 2022, it was announced that the Splatoon 3 amiibo would launch on November 11.  During Nintendo Live 2022 on 9 October, a Splatoon 3 concert was held starring Deep Cut.

Reception

Critical reception 

Splatoon 3 received "generally favorable" reviews according to review aggregator Metacritic. IGN reviewer Brendan Graeber called the third installment's multiplayer "more than just a simple upgrade", citing its additional maps, weapons, bosses, and customization, as well as its revamped lobby system. However, he criticized the game's lack of a "huge addition" similar to Splatoon 2s Salmon Run. Reviewing the game's single-player mode, he appreciated the new take on the series' hub world, as well as the returning ideas from Splatoon 2s Octo Expansion. He praised the story mode's lore, as well as its characters, while lamenting the reuse of enemies from previous games. He also reviewed Tableturf Battle, calling it a "lackluster card game" that "consistently ends with a whimper instead of a bang". Destructoids Chris Carter also praised how Return of the Mammalians interacted with the game's multiplayer modes, by both teaching the player important mechanics and rewarding them with useful items, as well as appreciating how the story mode was tailored for speedrunning.

Martin Robinson of Eurogamer criticized the lack of significant new content, saying that even the largest new additions are not something "that can be applauded too enthusiastically", and other features "basic [ones] you'd expect of a contemporary online multiplayer game". However, he called the Splatoon series "one of the most polished, playable and impeccably executed series" from Nintendo. He also compared the game's story mode to the Mario franchise, saying that while it evoked some of the best parts of Super Mario Sunshine, the abstract nature of the levels failed to meet the best Mario levels.

Kotakus Patricia Hernandez lamented the amount of disconnections while playing online, saying that it is "inexcusable".

Brian Shea of Game Informer praised the larger amount of content available at launch compared to previous entries in the series, as well as how the game blended new and returning content, calling it the series "best entry to date". He also praised the game's movement, saying that "few games match the smooth, intuitive mobility Splatoon gives you while submerged and cruising through a map".

Wireds Reid McCarter praised the game's original, cartoony characters, as opposed to brand crossovers and realistic graphics.

Sales
On 12 September 2022, Nintendo reported that Splatoon 3 had sold 3.45 million copies domestically within the first three days of launch, becoming the fastest-selling video game of all time in Japan (surpassing the previous record holder Pokémon Black and White) at the time, as well as one of the best-selling games on the Nintendo Switch. Shares of Nintendo were noted to have increased by 5.5 percent on the Tuesday following the announcement, the largest increase since December 2020. Splatoon 3 debuted at the top spot on the UK boxed charts, where it remained for three weeks until being pushed to second place by FIFA 23. As of 18 October 2022, Splatoon 3 was reported to be the highest-selling video game of 2022 in Japan, just over one month after its release.

Accolades

Notes

References

External links

Splatoon
Multiplayer and single-player video games
Nintendo Entertainment Planning & Development games
Nintendo games
Nintendo Switch games
Nintendo Switch-only games
Third-person shooters
Video games developed in Japan
Video games featuring protagonists of selectable gender
Video game sequels
2022 video games
Video games that use Amiibo figurines
Post-apocalyptic video games
The Game Awards winners
Video games with downloadable content